Gabriele Di Giulio (Frascati, 30 April 1994) is an Italian rugby union player. His usual position is as a Wing and he currently plays for Zebre in Pro14. 

Under contract with Calvisano, for 2015–16 Pro12 season, he named as Additional Player for Zebre. He played with Zebre from 2016 to 2022.

In 2014, Di Giulio was named in the Italy Under 20 squad and in 2015 and 2016 he was named in the Emerging Italy squad.

References

External links
It's Rugby Profile
Profile Player

1994 births
Living people
Italian rugby union players
Zebre Parma players
Rugby union wings
Rugby Calvisano players